The Laredo Columbia Solidarity Port of Entry is located at the Colombia – Solidarity International Bridge (sometimes referred to as "Bridge III").  It is the only port of entry from the Mexican state of Nuevo Leon.  It was built in 1991 in an effort to relieve traffic from the congested downtown Laredo bridges.

References

See also

 List of Mexico–United States border crossings
 List of Canada–United States border crossings

Mexico–United States border crossings
1991 establishments in Texas
Infrastructure completed in 1991
Buildings and structures in Laredo, Texas